Røssvoll Church is a parish church of the Church of Norway in Rana Municipality in Nordland county, Norway. It is located in the village of Røssvoll. It is the church for the Røssvoll parish which is part of the Indre Helgeland prosti (deanery) in the Diocese of Sør-Hålogaland. The white, wooden church was built in an octagonal style in 1952 using plans drawn up by the architects A. Nygård and Skyberg. The church seats about 250 people. The church was built with a donation from Anne Marie Bosse, which is why it is sometimes referred to as the Anne Marie Church.

Helgeland Kammerkor gave a Spring concert in Røssvoll Church in 2013.

Media gallery

See also
List of churches in Sør-Hålogaland

References

Rana, Norway
Churches in Nordland
Wooden churches in Norway
20th-century Church of Norway church buildings
Octagonal churches in Norway
Churches completed in 1953
1953 establishments in Norway